Marc Massion (born 12 November 1935) is a former member of the Senate of France, representing the Seine-Maritime department.  He is a member of the Socialist Party. He quit on 31 December 2013, and was replaced by Didier Marie.

References
Page on the Senate website

1935 births
Living people
French Senators of the Fifth Republic
Socialist Party (France) politicians
Senators of Seine-Maritime